The men's 110 metres hurdles event at the 1994 World Junior Championships in Athletics was held in Lisbon, Portugal, at Estádio Universitário de Lisboa on 21 and 22 July.  106.7 cm (3'6) (senior implement) hurdles were used.

Medalists

Results

Final
22 July
Wind: +2.1 m/s

Semifinals
21 July

Semifinal 1
Wind: +1.9 m/s

Semifinal 2
Wind: +2.1 m/s

Heats
21 July

Heat 1
Wind: +1.6 m/s

Heat 2
Wind: +1.4 m/s

Heat 3
Wind: +1.6 m/s

Heat 4
Wind: +1.7 m/s

Heat 5
Wind: +1.4 m/s

Participation
According to an unofficial count, 34 athletes from 25 countries participated in the event.

References

110 metres hurdles
Sprint hurdles at the World Athletics U20 Championships